Laojie station, is a station on the Shenzhen Metro. It provides cross-platform interchange between Line 1 and Line 3. The station is the busiest on the network with 61,600 passenger entries and exits a day. The Line 1 platforms opened on 28 December 2004 and the Line 3 platforms opened on 28 June 2011. It is located underneath the junction of Shennan Fudao, Jiefang Road and Jianshe Road in the Luohu District of Shenzhen, China. The station is the closest to the Dongmen Business Area, one of the oldest areas in Shenzhen established in the Ming dynasty.

Station layout

Exits

See also 
Dongmen
Chegongmiao station
Hongshuwan South station
Admiralty station (MTR)

References

External links
 Shenzhen Metro Laojie Station (Line 1) (Chinese)
 Shenzhen Metro Laojie Station (Line 1) (English)
 Shenzhen Metro Laojie Station (Line 3) (Chinese)
 Shenzhen Metro Laojie Station (Line 3) (English)

Railway stations in Guangdong
Shenzhen Metro stations
Luohu District
Railway stations in China opened in 2004
Railway stations located underground in China